Tiassalé  is a town in southern Ivory Coast. It is a sub-prefecture and the seat of Tiassalé Department in Agnéby-Tiassa Region, Lagunes District. Tiassalé is also a commune.

In 2021, the population of the sub-prefecture of Tiassalé was 83,648.

Villages
The 19 villages of the sub-prefecture of Tiassalé and their population in 2014 are:

Notes

Sub-prefectures of Agnéby-Tiassa
Communes of Agnéby-Tiassa